Harry Lewis (born 19 December 1896) was an English footballer who played as a striker for Liverpool in The Football League. Lewis signed for Liverpool following the end of the First World War and made 23 appearances during his debut season. He made a further 42 appearances over the next two seasons, but he was eventually transferred in 1923.

References

1896 births
English footballers
Hull City A.F.C. players
Liverpool F.C. players
English Football League players
Year of death missing
Association football forwards